Hobara may refer to:
 Hobara, Fukushima, a former town, now part of Date City
 Hobara Station
 Sayaka Hobara (born 1998), Japanese badminton player